"The Jolly Corner" is a short story by Henry James published first in the magazine The English Review of December 1908. One of James' most noted ghost stories, "The Jolly Corner" describes the adventures of Spencer Brydon as he prowls the now-empty New York house where he grew up.

He encounters a "sensation more complex than had ever before found itself consistent with sanity".

Plot summary
Spencer Brydon returns to New York City after thirty-three years abroad. He has returned to "look at his 'property'", two buildings, one his boyhood home on "the jolly corner". The second, larger structure is now going to be renovated into a big apartment building. These properties have been the source of his income since the deaths of his family members. Spencer finds he is good at directing this renovation, despite never having done this work before, suggesting that his innate ability for business was hiding deep within him unused. Spencer rekindles a relationship with an old friend, Alice Staverton. Both comment on his "real gift" for business and construction which he also finds "vulgar and sordid". He starts to wonder who he would have been if he had stayed in the U.S.

He starts to prowl the house at night to try to meet his American alter ego. Brydon has begun to realize that he might have been an astute businessman if he hadn't forsaken moneymaking for a more leisurely life. He discusses this possibility with Alice Staverton, his friend who has always lived in New York.

Meanwhile Brydon begins to believe that his alter ego—the ghost of the man he might have been—is haunting the "jolly corner", his nickname for the old family house. After a harrowing night of pursuit in the house, Brydon finally confronts the ghost, who advances on him and overpowers him with "a rage of personality before which his own collapsed". Brydon eventually awakens with his head pillowed on Alice Staverton's lap. It is arguable whether or not Spencer had actually become unconscious or whether he had died and has awoken in an afterlife. She had come to the house because she sensed he was in danger. She tells him that she pities the ghost of his alter ego, who has suffered and lost two fingers from his right hand. But she also embraces and accepts Brydon as he is.

Adaptations
A television version of the story was produced during 1975 with Fritz Weaver as Spencer Brydon and Salome Jens as Alice Staverton. An episode of Mike Flanagan's The Haunting of Bly Manor, also titled "The Jolly Corner", is inspired by this story.

References

 The Tales of Henry James by Edward Wagenknecht (New York: Frederick Ungar Publishing Co., 1984) 
 Modern Critical Views: Henry James edited by Harold Bloom (New York: Chelsea House Publishers 1987) 
 A Companion to Henry James Studies edited by Daniel Fogel (Westport, CT: Greenwood Press 1993)

External links
The New York Edition text of "The Jolly Corner", with the author's preface (1909)
 Note on the texts of "The Jolly Corner" at the Library of America web site
 IMDb page for the television version of The Jolly Corner (1975)
 

1908 short stories
Short stories by Henry James
Works originally published in The English Review
Ghosts in written fiction
Short stories adapted into films